Sermages is a commune in the Nièvre department in central France.

Demographics
On 1 January 2019, the estimated population was 191.

See also
Communes of the Nièvre department
Parc naturel régional du Morvan

References

External links

Official website 

Communes of Nièvre